Center of Financial Technologies (CFT) (Centr Finansovyh Tekhnologiy) is a Russian software company that provides software solutions and services to financial, healthcare and public sectors. It has been described as "Russia’s national payment system (like PayPal for Russia)". It is among the five largest software developing companies operating on the CIS market.

Operations
The company offers banking software and processing services.

Banking software
In financial services, the company's software is used in retail banking and corporate banking to automate processes. CFT also provides solution to capital market activities. 
 2MCA (Mission Critical Application) - universal banking system designed for federal and multi-divisional banks. 
 CFT-Bank (based on Oracle) - core banking system for operation, accounting, management systems automation.
 CFT-Retail Bank (based on Oracle) - retail banking solution.
 CFT-Data Warehouse (based on Oracle) - centralized information and analytic system for a corporate data warehouse.
 CFT-Front Office - front retail banking system
 CFT-Budget Planning, CFT-Management Accounts, bank management systems - systems for budgeting and management accounts.

Processing services
 Zolotaya Korona: Russian payment system that provides cash and cashless services. The system unites over 160 participants in 75 regions of Russian Federation and the CIS. As of January 1, 2009, the number of cards emitted in the system was 14,382, 223. The total turnover in the system reached 415.8  billion rubles.

 Zolotaya Korona - Money Transfers: instant money transfers without account opening, that unites over 20,000 points on the territory of RF and CIS, 220 banks and retailers; integrated with MoneyGram system.
 National bill consolidation system Gorod: collection and processing of utilities and other mass payments.
 Faktura.ru: interbank center that provides internet and mobile banking solutions for corporate and retail customers.
 Processing center CardStandard: provides processing services for emission and acquiring of international payment systems cards Visa International and MasterCard WorldWide.

Market role
CFT Group is among the top five largest software developers on the Russian market. According to IBS Intelligence, CFT occupies the 1st place according to the number of new contracts for core banking system on the Russian and CIS markets.
Among CFT customers are such banks as Sberbank of Russia, Gazprombank, MDM Bank, and Uralsib.

References

External links
Center of Financial Technologies

Banking technology
Outsourcing companies
Software companies of Russia
Banks established in 1991
Financial technology companies
Companies based in Novosibirsk
Sovetsky District, Novosibirsk
1991 establishments in Russia
Financial services companies established in 1991